Chloroclystis autopepla is a moth in the  family Geometridae. It is found on New Guinea.

References

Moths described in 1958
Chloroclystis
Moths of New Guinea